Ivo Jesus António e Alfredo (born May 29, 1968 in Matala) is a retired Angolan basketball player.  A 6’7”, 290-pound Center, he played on Angola’s 1990 FIBA World Championship and 1994 FIBA World Championship teams while winning two African titles in 1989 and 1992.

References

External links
Personal Page

1968 births
Living people
People from Huíla Province
Angolan men's basketball players
C.D. Primeiro de Agosto men's basketball players
Centers (basketball)
1994 FIBA World Championship players
1990 FIBA World Championship players